Gérard Istace (26 July 1935 – 21 March 2022) was a French politician.

A member of the Socialist Party, he served in the National Assembly from 1981 to 1986 and again from 1988 to 1993. He died in Revin on 21 March 2022 at the age of 86.

References

1935 births
2022 deaths
Socialist Party (France) politicians
People from Ardennes (department)
Deputies of the 7th National Assembly of the French Fifth Republic
Deputies of the 9th National Assembly of the French Fifth Republic